Al-Quwa Al-Jawiya is an Iraqi sports club based in Rusafa District, Baghdad that competes in the Iraqi Premier League, the top-flight of Iraqi football. Founded in 1931, it is the oldest existing club in Iraq.

Its football team is one of the most successful in Iraq having won seven Iraqi Premier League titles, most recently in the 2020–21 season, which it won alongside its fifth Iraq FA Cup title. The club also won a joint-record three Iraqi Elite Cups, and in 1996–97 it became the first of only two clubs to win all four major national trophies (League, FA Cup, Elite Cup, Super Cup) in the same season.

On the continental level, Al-Quwa Al-Jawiya are joint-record winners of the AFC Cup having become the first club to win three consecutive titles in 2016, 2017 and 2018. The Falcons have participated in the group stage of the AFC Champions League five times since its rebranding in 2002, and have previously reached the quarter-final of the Arab Club Champions Cup.

History
On 4 July 1931, 73 days after the foundation of the Iraqi Air Force, the club was founded by a group of Iraqi flight policemen at the British Royal Air Force station of RAF Hinaidi, making it the oldest existing football club in Iraq. The club was named Gipsy Moth after the model of the first fleet of the Iraqi Air Force, but soon the club was renamed to Al-Quwa Al-Jawiya Al-Malakiya, simply meaning Royal Air Force. They played their very first game a day later against a team from RAF Habbaniya and won the match dressed in army fatigues and short khakis. The win over the British forces helped the club grow in popularity as many Iraqis began supporting the club as its reputation spread across the nation.

As the British forces and its leaders saw that the club's activities had broadened and its members and followers had multiplied which was clearly seen in the matches they played in, the British wanted to get rid of some of its leaders, but King Ghazi, who took over as ruler of Iraq in 1933, had a strong relationship with the Iraqi flight policemen and he invited the members to have talks to solve the problem. It was not long before a solution for the development of the club had been decided on and they became under the control of another branch of the Iraqi Air Force, which opened a number of doors for the club around areas in Iraq. They won their first trophy on 19 May 1933, defeating Al-Lasilki 1–0 after extra time in the final of the Prince Ghazi Cup, thanks to a goal by Nasser Hussein, wearing the colours of green and purple. Jawiya and Al-Haras Al-Malaki (meaning Royal Guard) became close rivals with the two teams regularly competing for the Iraq Central FA League title (a league for teams in Baghdad and its neighbouring cities). This league competition started in 1948 and continued all the way until 1973 when the Central FA League and other regional leagues were replaced by the Iraqi National First Division.

Jawiya were one of the six teams to compete in the 1956–57 season which saw a double-elimination format introduced for the first time. In 1957, Jawiya completed the signing of Ammo Baba, one of the best players in Iraqi football history, and won their first league title in Ammo's first season at the club in 1957–58, after Montakhab Al-Shorta withdrew from the replay of the final. Al-Quwa Al-Jawiya Al-Malakiya were renamed to Al-Quwa Al-Jawiya (Air Force) when Iraq became a republic in 1958. The 1959–60 season saw Jawiya reach the final of the league again, but they lost 3–0 to Al-Athori. Jawiya secured their second league title in the 1961–62 season as the league changed to a round-robin format. This qualified them for the 1962 Iraq Central FA Altruism Cup (later known as Iraq Central FA Perseverance Cup) which they won by defeating Al-Kuliya Al-Askariya 4–2. Jawiya won the league title again in 1963–64 and also won the Iraq Central FA Altruism Cup again that year. They were once managed by Scotsman Frank Hill in the fifties, a player at Arsenal and manager at Notts County and Charlton Athletic – attempting on two separate occasions to sign Jawiya's star inside forward Ammo Baba. They had another British link as the team featured former Bristol Rovers reserve Youra Eshaya who went on to become one of the longest-serving players at the club from 1955 to 1971. Jawiya claimed their fourth title in 1972–73, winning the league with a 100% win record (seven wins from seven games).

The club continued their strong form and won the country's new nationwide league in the 1973–74 season. That season, Jawiya also won the first and only edition of the Iraq FA Baghdad Cup, a knockout tournament played between 20 teams from Baghdad and its neighbouring cities, by beating Al-Sikak Al-Hadeed 2–1 in the final. In 1974, the Iraq Football Association decided to form the Iraqi Premier League (then known as the Iraqi National Clubs First Division) which was only open to clubs rather than institute-representative teams. The club changed their name from Al-Quwa Al-Jawiya to Al-Tayaran (meaning Airlines) on 15 August 1974. The first ever edition of the Iraqi Premier League in the 1974–75 season saw Al-Tayaran claim the title, finishing just a single point above runners-up Al-Naqil, meaning they had won three league titles in a row (one Central FA First Division, one National First Division and one National Clubs First Division). All three titles were won under the management of Abdelilah Mohammed Hassan. Al-Tayaran won their first Iraq FA Cup title by beating Al-Shorta 5–3 on penalties in the 1978 final after a 1–1 draw, with Nadhum Shaker scoring the winning penalty.

In the 1989–90 season, Al-Tayaran managed to get their second Premier League title, known as the National Clubs First Division at the time. They finished four points ahead of defending champions Al-Rasheed. 12 goals from Natiq Hashim were crucial in winning Amer Jamil's Al-Tayaran the title. Midway through the 1990–91 season, on 20 April 1991, the Ministry of Interior decided to dissolve all the clubs that were under its control including Al-Bahri (Navy Club), Al-Jaish (Army Club) and Al-Tayaran. However, after immense pressure from supporters of the club, Al-Tayaran returned to action on 12 May 1991, but returned to their old name of Al-Quwa Al-Jawiya. The 1991–92 season saw Jawiya win their first ever national Double and goes down as one of the most successful seasons in the club's history. Managed by Adil Yousef, Jawiya claimed the title on the very last day of the season, defeating Al-Zawraa 1–0 in their last game thanks to an early goal by their top scorer Akram Emmanuel to overtake their opponents and claim the trophy. The game was controversial as Al-Zawraa scored a goal through Laith Hussein that was ruled out for offside; had the goal counted, Al-Zawraa would have retained their title. Jawiya coupled their league success with their second FA Cup win, defeating Al-Khutoot 2–1 in the cup final. Jawiya managed to win their first Elite Cup title in 1994 with a penalty shootout win over Al-Talaba after the game ended goalless.

Jawiya, under the leadership of Ayoub Odisho, started the 1996–97 season by winning the 1996 Iraqi Elite Cup. Jawiya also managed to win the Iraqi Premier League with 22 wins from 30 games with their top scorer being Sabah Jeayer. Four days before clinching the league title, Jawiya won their third Iraq FA Cup with a penalty shootout victory against Al-Shorta in front of 50,000 spectators at Al-Shaab Stadium. Jawiya became history-makers by winning the Iraqi Super Cup 3–1 against Al-Zawraa at the end of the season to become the first team in Iraqi football history to win all four major domestic trophies in a single season. The joy of the 1996–97 campaign was followed by a heartbreaking 1997–98 season. Jawiya conceded a 97th-minute equalising penalty to Al-Zawraa in the 1998 Iraq FA Cup final and lost the ensuing penalty shootout. Jawiya then drew 1–1 against Al-Zawraa in their last league match of the season, and missed out on the title to Al-Shorta after Al-Shorta scored a 91st-minute winning penalty in their match against Al-Sulaikh. Jawiya players mistakenly thought that Al-Shorta had drawn their match which would have made them champions and they began celebrating on the field, with Ayoub Odisho giving an interview on live television. Midway through Odisho's interview, the stadium announcer declared that the final score of Al-Shorta's game was 3–2 and that Al-Shorta were officially the champions of Iraq and Odisho stopped talking and stood still with a shocked expression on his face.

Jawiya clinched their third Elite Cup title in 1998 by beating Al-Naft in the final. Jawiya also managed to win the 2001 Iraqi Super Cup against Al-Zawraa with a 1–0 win. In 2003 the club briefly changed their name back to Al-Tayaran before returning to the name Al-Quwa Al-Jawiya again. Jawiya entered the 2004–05 season in search of a fifth Premier League title, and they managed to achieve it by beating Al-Minaa 2–0 in the final coached by Sabah Abdul-Jalil. In the 2006–07 season, Jawiya reached the final of the league again but lost it to hosts Erbil by a score of 1–0. Their position as league runners-up qualified them for the 2008 AFC Champions League but they exited at the group stage for the third time in a row. In the 2014–15 campaign, Jawiya qualified for the league final where they played newly promoted Naft Al-Wasat, and lost on penalties after a goalless draw. Jawiya won the 2015–16 Iraq FA Cup by defeating rivals Al-Zawraa 2–0, thus denying their opponents the Double.

By finishing as runners-up of the 2014–15 league, Jawiya qualified for the 2016 AFC Cup, Asia's second-tier club tournament. They reached the 2016 AFC Cup Final, where Hammadi Ahmad scored the only goal of the game against Indian side Bengaluru to become the first Iraqi club to win the AFC Cup and claim their first ever major continental trophy. Jawiya then went on to win the 2016–17 Iraqi Premier League, their sixth Premier League title, under the helm of Basim Qasim. They rounded off the season by winning their second consecutive AFC Cup, this time beating FC Istiklol 1–0 in the final. They then became the first team in history to win the AFC Cup three times in a row with a 2–0 win over Altyn Asyr in the 2018 final, and clinched their seventh Premier League title in the 2020–21 season under Ayoub Odisho, coupling it with the 2020–21 Iraq FA Cup title to earn their third national double.

Stadium

Al-Quwa Al-Jawiya's stadium is located in Baghdad, near Falastin Street, opposite the former stadium site of their rivals Al-Shorta. It has a capacity of 6,000. The seats are light blue in colour.

Kits
Al-Quwa Al-Jawiya's home kit is blue with white trimmings, while their away kit is yellow with blue trimmings. In the past, Jawiya have worn white away kits with blue trimmings and have also worn a red and white striped away kit with blue trimmings. Their past third kits include black with gold trimmings, purple with white trimmings and grey with white trimmings.

Rivalries

Al-Quwa Al-Jawiya's main rivals are Al-Zawraa, with whom they contest the Iraqi El Clásico. Jawiya also share a fierce rivalry with the other big Baghdad clubs, namely Al-Shorta and Al-Talaba.

Supporters
Al-Quwa Al-Jawiya are one of the traditional "Big Four" of Baghdad and thus have a large fanbase, concentrated mainly in Iraq's capital. The supporters call themselves Al-Soqoor, which means The Falcons; this is also the nickname of the club. In 2012, Jawiya fans decided to form an ultras group under the name Ultras Blue Hawks. The group has grown in number and is now in its thousands. They wave flags and banners at games, play instruments and set off flares and fireworks in order to create a good atmosphere at Jawiya's games; they aim to intimidate the opposition as well as inspire their own team.

Current squad

Out on loan

Managers

Current technical staff

{| class="toccolours"
!bgcolor=silver|Position
!bgcolor=silver|Name
!bgcolor=silver|Nationality
|- bgcolor=#eeeeee
|Manager:||Qahtan Chathir||
|- 
|Assistant manager:||Jabbar Hashim||
|- bgcolor=#eeeeee
|Assistant manager:||Jassim Ghulam Al-Hamd||
|- 
|Goalkeeping coach:||Salih Hameed||
|-bgcolor=#eeeeee
|Fitness coach:||Ayman Al-Habibi||
|- 
|Technical Advisor:||Nazar Ashraf||
|- 
|Technical Advisor:||Mejbel Fartous||
|- 
|Administrative director:||Haitham Kadhim||
|-
|Team supervisor:||Ahmed Khudhair||
|-bgcolor=#eeeeee
|Military team manager:||Falah Jahid||
|-
|U19 Manager:||Kadhim Flayih||
|- 
|U16 Manager:||Hiad Azher||
|-

Honours

Major

 
  shared record

Minor
New Iraq Championship
Winners (1): 2003
Jerusalem International Championship
Winners (1): 2001
Victory Championship
Winners (1): 1988
Farewell League Trophy
Winners (1): 1986
Al-Milad Cup
Winners (1): 1985
Al-Wehdat Championship
Winners (1): 1984
Stafford Cup
Winners (1): 1982
Army League
Winners (1): 1973–74
Army Cup
Winners (4): 1958, 1959, 1964, 1973 (shared record)
Authority Director Cup
Winners (1): 1964
Al-Firqa Al-Thaniya Cup
Winners (1): 1961
Inter-Forces Tournament
Winners (1): 1957
Wajih Younis Cup
Winners (1): 1956
Jamal Baban Cup
Winners (1): 1950
Al-Quwa Al-Jawiya Cup
Winners (2): 1941, 1942
Palestine Cup
Winners (1): 1942
Capital Secretariat Cup
Winners (1): 1941
Guardian Cup
Winners (1): 1940
Taha Al-Hashimi Cup
Winners (1): 1939
Casuals Cup
Winners (4): 1932–33, 1933–34, 1934–35, 1935–36 (record)
Prince Ghazi Cup
Winners (3): 1932–33, 1933–34, 1934–35 (record)

Statistics

In domestic competitions

Regional

National

See also
 Iraqi clubs in the AFC Club Competitions

References

External links
 Club squad on AFC official website

 
Football clubs in Iraq
Football clubs in Baghdad
Association football clubs established in 1931
Sport in Baghdad
1931 establishments in Iraq
Military association football clubs
AFC Cup winning clubs